The 1979 Society of West End Theatre Awards were held in 1979 in London at the Café Royal, celebrating excellence in West End theatre by the Society of West End Theatre. The awards would not become the Laurence Olivier Awards, as they are known today, until the 1984 ceremony.

Winners and nominees
Details of winners (in bold) and nominees, in each award category, per the Society of London Theatre.

{| class=wikitable width="100%"
|-
! width="50%" | Play of the Year
! width="50%" | Musical of the Year
|-
| valign="top" |
 Betrayal by Harold Pinter – National TheatreNight and Day by Tom Stoppard – Phoenix
 The Crucifer of Blood by Arthur Conan Doyle, adapted by Paul Giovanni – Theatre Royal Haymarket
 Undiscovered Country by Arthur Schnitzler, adapted by Tom Stoppard – National Theatre
| valign="top" |
 Songbook – GlobeAin't Misbehavin' – Her Majesty's
 Bar Mitzvah Boy – Adelphi
 Chicago – Cambridge
|-
! colspan=1| Comedy of the Year
|-
|
 Middle-Age Spread by Roger Hall – LyricClouds by Michael Frayn – Duke of York's
 Outside Edge by Richard Harris – Queen's Theatre
|-
! style="width="50%" | Actor of the Year in a New Play
! style="width="50%" | Actress of the Year in a New Play
|-
| valign="top" |
 Ian McKellen as Max in Bent – Royal Court / CriterionMichael Gambon as Jerry in Betrayal – National Theatre
 Dinsdale Landen as Mervyn in Bodies – Ambassadors
 John Standing as Benedict in Close of Play – National Theatre
| valign="top" |
 Jane Lapotaire as Édith Piaf in Piaf – RSC at the WarehouseConstance Cummings as Emily Stilson in Wings – National Theatre
 Gemma Jones as Helen Stott in And a Nightingale Sang – Queen's Theatre
 Jessica Tandy as Fonsia Dorsey in The Gin Game – Lyric
|-
! style="width="50%" | Actor of the Year in a Revival
! style="width="50%" | Actress of the Year in a Revival
|-
| valign="top" |
 Warren Mitchell as Willy Loman in Death of a Salesman – National TheatreMichael Bryant as David Roberts in Strife – National Theatre
 Jonathan Pryce as Petruchio in The Taming of the Shrew – RSC at the Aldwych
 Patrick Stewart as Shylock in The Merchant of Venice – RSC at the Warehouse
| valign="top" |
 Zoë Wanamaker as May Daniels in Once in a Lifetime – RSC at the AldwychPaola Dionisotti as Kate Minola in The Taming of the Shrew – RSC at the Aldwych
 Glenda Jackson as Cleopatra in Antony and Cleopatra – RSC at the Aldwych
 Billie Whitelaw as Winnie in Happy Days – Royal Court
|-
! style="width="50%" | Actor of the Year in a Musical
! style="width="50%" | Actress of the Year in a Musical
|-
| valign="top" |
 Anton Rodgers as Various in Songbook – GlobeTony Britton as Henry Higgins in My Fair Lady – Adelphi
 Michael Crawford as Charlie Gordon in Charlie and Algernon – Queen's Theatre
 Ben Cross as Billy Flynn in Chicago – Cambridge
| valign="top" |
 Virginia McKenna as Anna Leonowens in The King and I – London PalladiumCarol Channing as Dolly Levi in Hello, Dolly – Theatre Royal Drury Lane
 Antonia Ellis as Velma Kelly in Chicago – Cambridge
 Liz Robertson as Eliza Doolittle in My Fair Lady – Adelphi
|-
! colspan=1| Comedy Performance of the Year
|-
|
 Barry Humphries as Dame Edna Everage in A Night with Dame Edna – Piccadilly Richard Griffiths as George Lewis in Once in a Lifetime – RSC at the Aldwych
 Oscar James as Meadowlark Warner in Gloo Joo – Criterion
 Maureen Lipman as Maggie in Outside Edge – Queen's
|-
! style="width="50%" | Actor of the Year in a Supporting Role
! style="width="50%" | Actress of the Year in a Supporting Role
|-
| valign="top" |
 Patrick Stewart as Mark Antony in Antony and Cleopatra – RSC at the Aldwych Michael Bryant as Dr. von Aigner in Undiscovered Country – National Theatre
 Stephen Greif as Biff Loman in Death of a Salesman – National Theatre
 David Suchet as Herman Glogauer in Once in a Lifetime – RSC at the Aldwych
| valign="top" |
 Doreen Mantle as Linda Loman in Death of a Salesman – National Theatre Carmen du Sautoy as Miss Leighton in Once in a Lifetime – RSC at the Aldwych
 Alison Fiske as Evie Ardsley in For Services Rendered – National Theatre
 Patricia Routledge as Peggy Stott in And a Nightingale Sang – Queen's
|-
! colspan=1| Director of the Year
|-
|
 Michael Bogdanov for The Taming of the Shrew – RSC at the Aldwych  Michael Elliott for The Family Reunion – Vaudeville
 Trevor Nunn for Once in a Lifetime – RSC at the Aldwych
 Michael Rudman for Death of a Salesman – National Theatre
|-
! colspan=1| Designer of the Year
|-
|
 William Dudley for Undiscovered Country – National Theatre
 John Bury for Strife – National Theatre
 John Napier for Once in a Lifetime – RSC at the Aldwych
 Carl Toms for For Services Rendered – National Theatre
|-
! colspan=1| Outstanding Achievement of the Year in Ballet
! colspan=1| Outstanding Achievement in Opera
|-
| valign="top" |
 Peter Schaufuss for La Sylphide, London Festival Ballet – Royal Festival Hall
Kenneth MacMillan for Playground, The Royal Ballet – Sadler's Wells
 The Tempest, Ballet Rambert – Sadler's Wells
| valign="top" |
 The Rake's Progress, The Royal Opera – Royal Opera HouseDie Zauberflöte, The Royal Opera – Royal Opera House
 Manon, English National Opera – London Coliseum
 The Adventures of Mr Brouček, English National Opera – London Coliseum
|-
! colspan=1| Society Special Award
|-
|
 Laurence Olivier'|}

Productions with multiple nominations and awards
The following 13 productions received multiple nominations:

 6: Once in a Lifetime 4: Death of a Salesman 3: Chicago, The Taming of the Shrew and Undiscovered Country 2: And a Nightingale Sang, Antony and Cleopatra, Betrayal, For Services Rendered, My Fair Lady, Outside Edge, Songbook and StrifeThe following two productions received multiple awards:

 2: Death of a Salesman and Songbook''

See also
 33rd Tony Awards

References

External links
 Previous Olivier Winners – 1979

Laurence Olivier Awards ceremonies
Laurence Olivier Awards, 1979
1979 in London
1979 awards in the United Kingdom